Heterogeneous nuclear ribonucleoprotein L-like is a protein that in humans is encoded by the HNRNPLL gene.

Function 

HNRNPLL is a master regulator of activation-induced alternative splicing in T cells. In particular, it alters splicing of CD45 (PTPRC; MIM 151460), a tyrosine phosphatase essential for T-cell development and activation.

References

Further reading